Pavillon 21 MINI Opera Space, located on the Marstallplatz in Munich, is one of the performing spaces of the Bavarian State Opera. It was designed by Wolf Prix of the Austrian architectural firm, Coop Himmelb(l)au, with its € 2.1 million construction cost supported by BMW/MINI. Built of aluminum in the form of multiple pyramids, it covers an area of 560 square metres and has a height of 12.5 meters. The structure, which has a seating capacity of 300, was designed to be easily dismantled and reconstructed for other uses and in other locations as required. It was inaugurated in June 2010 for the Munich Opera Festival.

Sources
Bavarian State Opera (16 November 2009 ). Präsentation des "Pavillon 21 MINI Opera Space" 
Hynes, Ruth (17 November 2009). "Pavilion 21 MINI Opera Space by Coop Himmelb(l)au". Dezeen

External links
Official website

Theatres in Munich
Theatres completed in 2010
Music venues completed in 2010